Luke Scavuzzo (born March 10, 1956) is an American politician who served in the Missouri House of Representatives from the 124th district from 2007 to 2011.

References

1956 births
Living people
Democratic Party members of the Missouri House of Representatives